Jiang Xuelian (born 1 May 1979) is a former Chinese badminton player, who later represented Canada. Jiang was joined the Chongqing badminton team in 1993. In 1997, she entered the Sichuan Institute of Sports & Technology, and at the same year she was selected to join the national team. In 2001, she competed at the IBF World Championships in Seville, Spain, and won the women's doubles bronze with Chen Lin. She was retired from the national team in 2004, and in 2009, she started to represent Canada.

Achievements

IBF World Championships
Women's doubles

BWF Grand Prix 
The BWF Grand Prix has two level such as Grand Prix and Grand Prix Gold. It is a series of badminton tournaments, sanctioned by Badminton World Federation (BWF) since 2007.  The World Badminton Grand Prix sanctioned by International Badminton Federation since 1983.

Women's doubles

Mixed doubles

 BWF Grand Prix Gold tournament
 BWF & IBF Grand Prix tournament

BWF International Challenge/Series
Mixed doubles

 BWF International Challenge tournament
 BWF International Series/European Circuit tournament

References

External links 

 
 Profile at Badmintoncn.com

1979 births
Living people
Badminton players from Chongqing
Chinese female badminton players
Canadian female badminton players
Chinese emigrants to Canada
Naturalized citizens of Canada
Canadian sportspeople of Chinese descent